The 2022–23 Buffalo Sabres season is the 53rd season for the National Hockey League franchise that was established on May 22, 1970. This is the first season since the inaugural season in 1970–71 in which Rick Jeanneret will not call games. They will attempt to snap their 11-season playoff drought, which is the longest current playoff drought in the NHL.

Standings

Divisional standings

Eastern Conference

Schedule and results

Regular season
The regular season schedule was published on July 6, 2022.

Player statistics
Updated to game played March 19, 2023

Skaters

Goaltenders

†Denotes player spent time with another team before joining the Sabres. Stats reflect time with the Sabres only.
‡Denotes player was traded mid-season. Stats reflect time with the Sabres only.
Bold/italics denotes franchise record.

Roster

Transactions
The Sabres have been involved in the following transactions during the 2022–23 season.

Key:

 Contract is entry-level.
 Contract initially takes effect in the 2023–24 season.

Trades

Players acquired

Players lost

Signings

Draft Picks 

Below are the Buffalo Sabres' selections at the 2022 NHL Entry Draft, which was held on July 7 to 8, 2022, at Bell Centre in Montreal.

References

2022–23 NHL season by team
Buffalo Sabres seasons
2022 in sports in New York (state)
2023 in sports in New York (state)